James Biber is an architect and partner in the firm Biber Architects, based in New York.

Early life and education 
Biber was born in New Rochelle, New York. He attended Cornell University, studying Biology before receiving his professional degree in Architecture in 1976.  Upon graduation James received the Matthew DelGaudio Award in total design and the Shreve Fund Award, as well as the James Eidlitz Traveling Fellowship, on which he traveled in Europe for 6 months.

Career
Biber spent his early career at Paul Segal Associates, becoming the Senior Associate and leaving in 1984 to establish James Biber Architect. Biber's firm practiced in a studio that included Carin Goldberg, a graphic designer whom he married in 1987, and the illustrator/designer Gene Greif who died in 2004.

In 1991, the design firm Pentagram Design invited Biber to join as a partner in the New York office as the first architect in that office. Biber left Pentagram in October 2010 to establish his own New York-based studio, Biber Architects. He has described his work as the "Architecture of Identity."

Notable buildings and projects 
Biber's most recent project is the USA Pavilion for Expo Milano 2015. Biber's career has also included the design of the Harley-Davidson Museum in Milwaukee, 2008; oceanfront houses in Montauk, NY; a restoration of the 1934 Sten-Frenke house in Santa Monica, by Richard Neutra; along with projects at Celebration, Florida; store, suites and lounges in the Arizona Cardinals Football Stadium (by Peter Eisenman) in Phoenix, Arizona; Headquarters for the Muzak corporation in Fort Mill, SC.

He designed the iconic Needle and Button kiosk for the Fashion Center BID in New York's fashion district; a pop-up restaurant for the James Beard Foundation, JBF LTD; the Public Gallery at the Koch Institute for Integrative Cancer Research; the Visitor's Center for Philip Johnson's Glass House in New Canaan, CT; sets for The Daily Show with Jon Stewart; the Macaulay Honors College at CUNY; and the JEHT Foundation headquarters.

Publications 
Biber's work has appeared in numerous books and articles including Houses of the Hamptons, by Paul Goldberger, "Restaurants that Work," by Martin Dorf, Articles in The New York Times, The New York Times Magazine, New York Magazine, Architect, Architectural Record, Blueprint, Metropolis, Metropolitan Home, Interiors, Interior Design, I.D., Fast Company, Business Week, The Wall Street Journal, Wallpaper and dozens of other international publications.
His work is featured in 3 of the books on Pentagram Design, "Pentagram: the Compendium", "Pentagram Book Five" and "Profile: Pentagram Design" as well as in "Pentagram Paper 38: The Russian Garbo". Biber is currently working on a book of Ideas for New York.

Awards and recognitions 
James Biber was elected to the American Institute of Architects College of Fellows in 2004.  A member of the AIA, NCARB, US Green Building Council, The Architectural League, The Storefront for Art and Architecture and other professional design organizations.  He has received awards recognizing his projects from the AIA, SEGD, AIGA, Business Week IDEA Awards among others.  James Biber is a LEED accredited professional (LEED AP).

References

New York Times, A Feast of Architectural Styles for Expo Milano 2015

External links
 Biber Architects official website
 Article on Pentagram at Inc.com
 James Biber designs hometheater at coolhunter.co.uk
 James Biber designs Daily Show Set on BusinessWeek.com
 Reprint of Pentagram Paper #38, The Russian Garbo on blog/Pentagram.com

Living people
Year of birth missing (living people)
Cornell University College of Architecture, Art, and Planning alumni
20th-century American architects
Artists from New Rochelle, New York
21st-century American architects
Pentagram partners (past and present)